Sri Aurobindo (born Aurobindo Ghose; 15 August 1872 – 5 December 1950) was an Indian philosopher, yogi, maharishi, poet, and Indian nationalist. He was also a journalist, editing newspapers such as Vande Mataram. He joined the Indian movement for independence from British colonial rule, until 1910 was one of its influential leaders, and then became a spiritual reformer, introducing his visions on human progress and spiritual evolution.

Aurobindo studied for the Indian Civil Service at King's College, Cambridge, England. After returning to India he took up various civil service works under the Maharaja of the Princely state of Baroda and became increasingly involved in nationalist politics in the Indian National Congress and the nascent revolutionary movement in Bengal with the Anushilan Samiti. He was arrested in the aftermath of a number of bombings linked to his organization in a public trial where he faced charges of treason for Alipore Conspiracy. However, Sri Aurobindo could only be convicted and imprisoned for writing articles against British colonial rule in India. He was released when no evidence could be provided, following the murder of a prosecution witness, Narendranath Goswami, during the trial. During his stay in the jail, he had mystical and spiritual experiences, after which he moved to Pondicherry, leaving politics for spiritual work.

At Pondicherry, Sri Aurobindo developed a spiritual practice he called Integral Yoga. The central theme of his vision was the evolution of human life into a divine life in divine body. He believed in a spiritual realisation that not only liberated but transformed human nature, enabling a divine life on earth. In 1926, with the help of his spiritual collaborator, Mirra Alfassa (referred to as "The Mother"), Sri Aurobindo Ashram was founded.

His main literary works are The Life Divine, which deals with the philosophical aspect of Integral Yoga; Synthesis of Yoga, which deals with the principles and methods of Integral Yoga; and Savitri: A Legend and a Symbol, an epic poem.

Biography

Early life 
Aurobindo Ghose was born in Calcutta (now Kolkata), Bengal Presidency, India on 15 August 1872 in a Bengali family that was associated with the village of Konnagar in the Hooghly district of present-day West Bengal. His father, Krishna Dhun Ghose, was then assistant surgeon of Rangpur in Bengal and later civil surgeon of Khulna, and a former member of the Brahmo Samaj religious reform movement who had become enamoured with the then-new idea of evolution while pursuing medical studies in Edinburgh. His mother Swarnalata Devi's father Shri Rajnarayan Bose was a leading figure in the Samaj. She had been sent to the more salubrious surroundings of Calcutta for Aurobindo's birth. Aurobindo had two elder siblings, Benoybhusan and Manmohan, a younger sister, Sarojini, and a younger brother, Barindra Kumar (also referred to as Barin).

Young Aurobindo was brought up speaking English, but used Hindustani to communicate with servants. Although his family were Bengali, his father believed British culture to be superior. He and his two elder siblings were sent to the English-speaking Loreto House boarding school in Darjeeling, in part to improve their language skills and in part to distance them from their mother, who had developed a mental illness soon after the birth of her first child. Darjeeling was a centre of Anglo-Indians in India and the school was run by Irish nuns, through which the boys would have been exposed to Christian religious teachings and symbolism.

England (1879–1893) 

Krishna Dhun Ghose wanted his sons to enter the Indian Civil Service (ICS), an elite organisation comprising around 1000 people. To achieve this it was necessary that they study in England and so it was there that the entire family moved in 1879. The three brothers were placed in the care of the Reverend W. H. Drewett in Manchester. Drewett was a minister of the Congregational Church whom Krishna Dhun Ghose knew through his British friends at Rangpur.

The boys were taught Latin by Drewett and his wife. This was a prerequisite for admission to good English schools and, after two years, in 1881, the elder two siblings were enrolled at Manchester Grammar School. Aurobindo was considered too young for enrolment, and he continued his studies with the Drewetts, learning history, Latin, French, geography and arithmetic. Although the Drewetts were told not to teach religion, the boys inevitably were exposed to Christian teachings and events, which generally bored Aurobindo and sometimes repulsed him. There was little contact with his father, who wrote only a few letters to his sons while they were in England, but what communication there was indicated that he was becoming less endeared to the British in India than he had been, on one occasion describing the British colonial government as "heartless".

Drewett emigrated to Australia in 1884, causing the boys to be uprooted as they went to live with Drewett's mother in London. In September of that year, Aurobindo and Manmohan joined St Paul's School there. He learned Greek and spent the last three years reading literature and English poetry, while he also acquired some familiarity with the German and Italian languages; Peter Heehs resumes his linguistic abilities by stating that at "the turn of the century he knew at least twelve languages: English, French, and Bengali to speak, read, and write; Latin, Greek, and Sanskrit to read and write; Gujarati, Marathi, and Hindi to speak and read; and Italian, German, and Spanish to read." Being exposed to the evangelical structures of Drewett's mother developed in him a distaste for religion, and he considered himself at one point to be an atheist but later determined that he was agnostic. A blue plaque unveiled in 2007 commemorates Aurobindo's residence at 49 St Stephen's Avenue in Shepherd's Bush, London, from 1884 to 1887. The three brothers began living in spartan circumstances at the Liberal Club in South Kensington during 1887, their father having experienced some financial difficulties. The club's secretary was James Cotton, brother of their father's friend in the Bengal ICS, Henry Cotton.

By 1889, Manmohan had determined to pursue a literary career and Benoybhusan had proved himself unequal to the standards necessary for ICS entrance. This meant that only Aurobindo might fulfill his father's aspirations but to do so when his father lacked money required that he studied hard for a scholarship. To become an ICS official, students were required to pass the competitive examination, as well as to study at an English university for two years under probation. Aurobindo secured a scholarship at King's College, Cambridge, under recommendation of Oscar Browning. He passed the written ICS examination after a few months, being ranked 11th out of 250 competitors. He spent the next two years at King's College. Aurobindo had no interest in the ICS and came late to the horse-riding practical exam purposefully to get himself disqualified for the service.

At this time, the Maharaja of Baroda, Sayajirao Gaekwad III, was travelling in England. Cotton secured for him a place in Baroda State Service and arranged for him to meet the prince. He left England for India, arriving there in February 1893. In India, Krishna Dhun Ghose, who was waiting to receive his son, was misinformed by his agents from Bombay (now Mumbai) that the ship on which Aurobindo had been travelling had sunk off the coast of Portugal. His father died upon hearing this news.

Baroda and Calcutta (1893–1910) 

In Baroda, Aurobindo joined the state service in 1893, working first in the Survey and Settlements department, later moving to the Department of Revenue and then to the Secretariat, and much miscellaneous work like teaching grammar and assisting in writing speeches for the Maharaja of Gaekwad until 1897. In 1897 during his work in Baroda, he started working as a part-time French teacher at Baroda College (now Maharaja Sayajirao University of Baroda). He was later promoted to the post of vice-principal. At Baroda, Aurobindo self-studied Sanskrit and Bengali.

During his stay at Baroda, he had contributed to many articles to Indu Prakash and had spoken as a chairman of the Baroda college board. He started taking an active interest in the politics of the Indian independence movement against British colonial rule, working behind the scenes as his position in the Baroda state administration barred him from an overt political activity. He linked up with resistance groups in Bengal and Madhya Pradesh, while travelling to these states. Aurobindo established contact with Lokmanya Tilak and Sister Nivedita.

Aurobindo often travelled between Baroda and Bengal, at first in a bid to re-establish links with his parents' families and other Bengali relatives, including his sister Sarojini and brother Barin, and later increased to establish resistance groups across the Presidency. He formally moved to Calcutta in 1906 after the announcement of the Partition of Bengal. In 1901, on a visit to Calcutta, he married 14-year-old Mrinalini, the daughter of Bhupal Chandra Bose, a senior official in government service. Aurobindo was 28 at that time. Mrinalini died seventeen years later in December 1918 during the influenza pandemic.

In 1906, Aurobindo was appointed the first principal of the National College in Calcutta, started to impart national education to Indian youth. He resigned from this position in August 1907, due to his increased political activity. The National College continues to the present as Jadavpur University, Kolkata.

Aurobindo was influenced by studies on rebellion and revolutions against England in medieval France and the revolts in America and Italy. In his public activities, he favored Non cooperation and Passive resistance; in private he took up secret revolutionary activity as a preparation for open revolt, in case that the passive revolt failed.

In Bengal, with Barin's help, he established contacts and inspired revolutionaries such as Bagha Jatin or Jatin Mukherjee and Surendranath Tagore. He helped establish a series of youth clubs, including the Anushilan Samiti of Calcutta in 1902.

Aurobindo attended the 1906 Congress meeting headed by Dadabhai Naoroji and participated as a councilor in forming the fourfold objectives of "Swaraj, Swadesh, Boycott, and national education". In 1907 at the Surat session of Congress where moderates and extremists had a major showdown, he led along with extremists along with Bal Gangadhar Tilak. The Congress split after this session. In 1907–1908 Aurobindo travelled extensively to Pune, Bombay and Baroda to firm up support for the nationalist cause, giving speeches and meeting with groups. He was arrested again in May 1908 in connection with the Alipore Bomb Case. He was acquitted in the ensuing trial, following the murder of chief prosecution witness Naren Goswami within jail premises, which subsequently led to the case against him collapsing. Aurobindo was subsequently released after a year of isolated incarceration.

Once out of the prison he started two new publications, Karmayogin in English and Dharma in Bengali. He also delivered the, Uttarpara Speech hinting at the transformation of his focus to spiritual matters. Repression from the British colonial government against him continued because of his writings in his new journals and in April 1910 Aurobindo moved to Pondicherry, where the British colonial secret police monitored his activities.

Conversion from politics to spirituality 

In July 1905 then Viceroy of India, Lord Curzon, partitioned Bengal. This sparked an outburst of public anger against the British, leading to civil unrest and a nationalist campaign by groups of revolutionaries that included Aurobindo. In 1908, Khudiram Bose and Prafulla Chaki attempted to kill Magistrate Kingsford, a judge known for handing down particularly severe sentences against nationalists. However, the bomb thrown at his horse carriage missed its target and instead landed in another carriage and killed two British women, the wife and daughter of barrister Pringle Kennedy. Aurobindo was also arrested on charges of planning and overseeing the attack and imprisoned in solitary confinement in Alipore Jail. The trial of the Alipore Bomb Case lasted for a year, but eventually, he was acquitted on 6 May 1909. His defense counsel was Chittaranjan Das.

During this period in the Jail, his view of life was radically changed due to spiritual experiences and realizations. Consequently, his aim went far beyond the service and liberation of the country. 

Aurobindo said he was "visited" by Vivekananda in the Alipore Jail: "It is a fact that I was hearing constantly the voice of Vivekananda speaking to me for a fortnight in the jail in my solitary meditation and felt his presence."

In his autobiographical notes, Aurobindo said he felt a vast sense of calmness when he first came back to India. He could not explain this and continued to have various such experiences from time to time. He knew nothing of yoga at that time and started his practice of it without a teacher, except for some rules that he learned from Mr. Devadhar, a friend who was a disciple of Swami Brahmananda of Ganga Math, Chandod.   In 1907, Barin introduced Aurobindo to Vishnu Bhaskar Lele, a Maharashtrian yogi. Aurobindo was influenced by the guidance he got from the yogi, who had instructed Aurobindo to depend on an inner guide and any kind of external guru or guidance would not be required.

In 1910 Aurobindo withdrew himself from all political activities and went into hiding at Chandannagar in the house of Motilal Roy, while the British colonial government were attempting to prosecute him for sedition on the basis of a signed article titled 'To My Countrymen', published in Karmayogin. As Aurobindo disappeared from view, the warrant was held back and the prosecution postponed. Aurobindo manoeuvred the police into open action and a warrant was issued on 4 April 1910, but the warrant could not be executed because on that date he had reached Pondicherry, then a French colony. The warrant against Aurobindo was withdrawn.

Pondicherry (1910–1950) 
In Pondicherry, Sri Aurobindo dedicated himself to his spiritual and philosophical pursuits. In 1914, after four years of secluded yoga, he started a monthly philosophical magazine called Arya. This ceased publication in 1921. Many years later, he revised some of these works before they were published in book form. Some of the book series derived out of this publication was The Life Divine, The Synthesis of Yoga, Essays on The Gita, The Secret of The Veda, Hymns to the Mystic Fire, The Upanishads, The Renaissance in India, War and Self-determination, The Human Cycle, The Ideal of Human Unity and The Future Poetry were published in this magazine.

At the beginning of his stay at Pondicherry, there were few followers, but with time their numbers grew, resulting in the formation of the Sri Aurobindo Ashram in 1926. From 1926 he started to sign himself as Sri Aurobindo, Sri being commonly used as an honorific.

For some time afterwards, his main literary output was his voluminous correspondence with his disciples. His letters, most of which were written in the 1930s, numbered in the several thousand. Many were brief comments made in the margins of his disciple's notebooks in answer to their questions and reports of their spiritual practice—others extended to several pages of carefully composed explanations of practical aspects of his teachings. These were later collected and published in book form in three volumes of Letters on Yoga. In the late 1930s, he resumed work on a poem he had started earlier—he continued to expand and revise this poem for the rest of his life. It became perhaps his greatest literary achievement, Savitri, an epic spiritual poem in blank verse of approximately 24,000 lines.

On 15 August 1947, Sri Aurobindo strongly opposed the partition of India, stating that he hoped "the Nation will not accept the settled fact as for ever settled, or as anything more than a temporary expedient."

Sri Aurobindo was nominated twice for the Nobel prize without it being awarded, in 1943 for the Nobel award in Literature and in 1950 for the Nobel award in Peace.

Sri Aurobindo died on 5 December 1950, of uremia. Around 60,000 people attended to see his body resting peacefully. Indian Prime Minister Jawaharlal Nehru, and the President Rajendra Prasad praised him for his contribution to Yogic philosophy and the independence movement. National and international newspapers commemorated his death.

Mirra Alfassa (The Mother) and the development of the Ashram 
Sri Aurobindo's close spiritual collaborator, Mirra Alfassa (born Alfassa), came to be known as The Mother. She was a French national, born in Paris on 21 February 1878. In her 20s she studied occultism with Max Theon. Along with her husband, Paul Richard, she went to Pondicherry on 29 March 1914, and finally settled there in 1920. Sri Aurobindo considered her his spiritual equal and collaborator. After 24 November 1926, when Sri Aurobindo retired into seclusion, he left it to her to plan, build and run the ashram, the community of disciples which had gathered around them. Sometime later, when families with children joined the ashram, she established and supervised the Sri Aurobindo International Centre of Education with its experiments in the field of education. When he died in 1950, she continued their spiritual work, directed the ashram, and guided their disciples.

Philosophy and spiritual vision

Introduction 
Sri Aurobindo's concept of the Integral Yoga system is described in his books, The Synthesis of Yoga and The Life Divine.  The Life Divine is a compilation of essays published serially in Arya.

Sri Aurobindo argues that divine Brahman manifests as empirical reality through līlā, or divine play. Instead of positing that the world we experience is an illusion (māyā), Aurobindo argues that world can evolve and become a new world with new species, far above the human species just as human species have evolved after the animal species. As such he argued that the end goal of spiritual practice could not merely be a liberation from the world into Samadhi but would also be that of descent of the Divine into the world in order to transform it into a Divine existence. Thus, this constituted the purpose of Integral Yoga. Regarding the involution of consciousness in matter, he wrote that: "This descent, this sacrifice of the Purusha, the Divine Soul submitting itself to Force and Matter so that it may inform and illuminate them is the seed of redemption of this world of Inconscience and Ignorance."

Sri Aurobindo believed that Darwinism merely describes a phenomenon of the evolution of matter into life, but does not explain the reason behind it, while he finds life to be already present in matter, because all of existence is a manifestation of Brahman. He argues that nature (which he interpreted as divine) has evolved life out of matter and the mind out of life. All of existence, he argues, is attempting to manifest to the level of the supermind – that evolution had a purpose. He stated that he found the task of understanding the nature of reality arduous and difficult to justify by immediate tangible results.

Supermind 

At the centre of Aurobindo's metaphysical system is the supermind, an intermediary power between the unmanifested Brahman and the manifested world. Aurobindo claims that the supermind is not completely alien to us and can be realized within ourselves as it is always present within mind since the latter is in reality identical with the former and contains it as a potentiality within itself. Aurobindo does not portray supermind as an original invention of his own but believes it can be found in the Vedas and that the Vedic Gods represent powers of the supermind. In The Integral Yoga he declares that "By the supermind is meant the full Truth-Consciousness of the Divine Nature in which there can be no place for the principle of division and ignorance; it is always a full light and knowledge superior to all mental substance or mental movement." Supermind is a bridge between Sachchidananda and the lower manifestation and it is only through the supramental that mind, life and body can be spiritually transformed as opposed to through Sachchidananda The descent of supermind will mean the creation of a supramental race

Affinity with Western philosophy 
In his writings, talks, and letters Sri Aurobindo has referred to several European philosophers with whose basic concepts he was familiar, commenting on their ideas and discussing the question of affinity to his own line of thought. Thus, he wrote a long essay on the Greek philosopher Heraclitus and mentioned especially Plato, Plotinus, Nietzsche and Bergson as thinkers in whom he was interested because of their more intuitive approach. On the other hand, he felt little attraction for the philosophy of Kant or Hegel. Several studies have shown a remarkable closeness to the evolutionary thought of Teilhard de Chardin, whom he did not know, whereas the latter came to know of Sri Aurobindo at a late stage. After reading some chapters of The Life Divine, he is reported to have said that Sri Aurobindo's vision of evolution was basically the same as his own, though stated for Asian readers.

Several scholars have discovered significant similarities in the thought of Sri Aurobindo and Hegel. Steve Odin has discussed this subject comprehensively in a comparative study. Odin writes that Sri Aurobindo "has appropriated Hegel’s notion of an Absolute Spirit and employed it to radically restructure the architectonic framework of the ancient Hindu Vedanta system in contemporary terms." In his analysis Odin arrives at the conclusion that "both philosophers similarly envision world creation as the progressive self-manifestation and evolutionary ascent of a universal consciousness in its journey toward Self-realization." He points out that in contrast to the deterministic and continuous dialectal unfolding of Absolute Reason by the mechanism of thesis-antithesis-synthesis or affirmation-negation-integration, "Sri Aurobindo argues for a creative, emergent mode of evolution." In his résumé Odin states that Sri Aurobindo has overcome the ahistorical world-vision of traditional Hinduism and presented a concept which allows for a genuine advance and novelty.

Importance of the Upanishads 
Although Sri Aurobindo was familiar with the most important lines of thought in Western philosophy, he did not acknowledge their influence on his own writings. He wrote that his philosophy "was formed first by the study of the Upanishads and the Gita… They were the basis of my first practice of Yoga." With the help of his readings he tried to move on to actual experience, "and it was on this experience that later on I founded my philosophy, not on ideas themselves."

He assumes that the seers of the Upanishads had basically the same approach and gives some details of his vision of the past in a long passage in The Renaissance of India. "The Upanishads have been the acknowledged source of numerous profound philosophies and religions," he writes. Even Buddhism with all its developments was only a "restatement" from a new standpoint and with fresh terms. And, furthermore, the ideas of the Upanishads "can be rediscovered in much of the thought of Pythagoras and Plato and form the profound part of Neo-platonism and Gnosticism..." Finally, the larger part of German metaphysics "is little more in substance than an intellectual development of great realities more spiritually seen in this ancient teaching." When once he was asked by a disciple whether Plato got some of his ideas from Indian books, he responded that though something of the philosophy of India got through "by means of Pythagoras and others", he assumed that Plato got most of his ideas from intuition.

Sri Aurobindo's indebtedness to the Indian tradition also becomes obvious through his placing a large number of quotations from the Rig Veda, the Upanishads and the Bhagavadgita at the beginning of the chapters in The Life Divine, showing the connection of his own thought to Veda and Vedanta.

The Isha Upanishad is considered to be one of the most important and more accessible writings of Sri Aurobindo. Before he published his final translation and analysis, he wrote ten incomplete commentaries. In a key passage he points out that the Brahman or Absolute is both the Stable and the Moving. "We must see it in eternal and immutable Spirit and in all the changing manifestations of universe and relativity." Sri Aurobindo's biographer K.R.S. Iyengar quotes R.S. Mugali as stating that Sri Aurobindo might have obtained in this Upanishad the thought-seed which later grew into The Life Divine.

Synthesis and integration 
Sisir Kumar Maitra, who was a leading exponent of Sri Aurobindo's Philosophy, has referred to the issue of external influences and written that Sri Aurobindo does not mention names, but "as one reads his books one cannot fail to notice how thorough is his grasp of the great Western philosophers of the present age..." Although he is Indian one should not "underrate the influence of Western thought upon him. This influence is there, very clearly visible, but Sri Aurobindo... has not allowed himself to be dominated by it. He has made full use of Western thought, but he has made use of it for the purpose of building up his own system..." Thus Maitra, like Steve Odin, sees Sri Aurobindo not only in the tradition and context of Indian, but also Western philosophy and assumes he may have adopted some elements from the latter for his synthesis.

R. Puligandla supports this viewpoint in his book Fundamentals of Indian Philosophy. He describes Sri Aurobindo's philosophy as "an original synthesis of the Indian and Western traditions." "He integrates in a unique fashion the great social, political and scientific achievements of the modern West with the ancient and profound spiritual insights of Hinduism. The vision that powers the life divine of Aurobindo is none other than the Upanishadic vision of the unity of all existence."

Puligandla also discusses Sri Aurobindo's critical position vis-à-vis Shankara and his thesis that the latter's Vedanta is a world-negating philosophy, as it teaches that the world is unreal and illusory. From Puligandla's standpoint this is a misrepresentation of Shankara's position, which may have been caused by Sri Aurobindo's endeavour to synthesize Hindu and Western modes of thought, identifying Shankara's Mayavada with the subjective idealism of George Berkeley.

However, Sri Aurobindo's critique of Shankara is supported by U. C. Dubey in his paper titled Integralism: The Distinctive Feature of Sri Aurobindo’s Philosophy. He points out that Sri Aurobindo's system presents an integral view of Reality where there is no opposition between the Absolute and its creative force, as they are actually one. Furthermore, he refers to Sri Aurobindo's conception of the supermind as the mediatory principle between the Absolute and the finite world and quotes S.K. Maitra stating that this conception "is the pivot round which the whole of Sri Aurobindo’s philosophy moves."

Dubey proceeds to analyse the approach of the Shankarites and believes that they follow an inadequate kind of logic that does not do justice to the challenge of tackling the problem of the Absolute, which cannot be known by finite reason. With the help of the finite reason, he says, "we are bound to determine the nature of reality as one or many, being or becoming. But Sri Aurobindo's Integral Advaitism reconciles all apparently different aspects of Existence in an all-embracing unity of the Absolute." Next, Dubey explains that for Sri Aurobindo there is a higher reason, the "logic of the infinite" in which his integralism is rooted.

Legacy 

Sri Aurobindo was an Indian nationalist but is best known for his philosophy on human evolution and Integral Yoga.

Influence 
His influence has been wide-ranging. In India, S. K. Maitra, Anilbaran Roy and D. P. Chattopadhyaya commented on Sri Aurobindo's work. Writers on esotericism and traditional wisdom, such as Mircea Eliade, Paul Brunton, and Rene Guenon, all saw him as an authentic representative of the Indian spiritual tradition. Though Rene Guenon thought Sri Aurobindo's thoughts were betrayed by some of his followers and that some works published under his name were not authentic, since not traditional.

Haridas Chaudhuri and Frederic Spiegelberg were among those who were inspired by Aurobindo, who worked on the newly formed American Academy of Asian Studies in San Francisco. Soon after, Chaudhuri and his wife Bina established the Cultural Integration Fellowship, from which later emerged the California Institute of Integral Studies.

Sri Aurobindo influenced Subhash Chandra Bose to take an initiative of dedicating to Indian National Movement full-time. Bose writes, "The illustrious example of Arabindo Ghosh looms large before my vision. I feel that I am ready to make the sacrifice which that example demands of me."

Karlheinz Stockhausen was heavily inspired by Satprem's writings about Sri Aurobindo during a week in May 1968, a time at which the composer was undergoing a personal crisis and had found Sri Aurobindo's philosophies were relevant to his feelings. After this experience, Stockhausen's music took a completely different turn, focusing on mysticism, that was to continue until the end of his career.

Jean Gebser acknowledged Sri Aurobindo's influence on his work and referred to him several times in his writings. Thus, in The Invisible Origin he quotes a long passage from The Synthesis of Yoga. Gebser believes that he was "in some way brought into the extremely powerful spiritual field of force radiating through Sri Aurobindo." In his title Asia Smiles Differently he reports about his visit to the Sri Aurobindo Ashram and meeting with the Mother whom he calls an "exceptionally gifted person."

After meeting Sri Aurobindo in Pondicherry in 1915, the Danish author and artist Johannes Hohlenberg published one of the first Yoga titles in Europe and later on wrote two essays on Sri Aurobindo. He also published extracts from The Life Divine in Danish translation.

William Irwin Thompson travelled to Auroville in 1972, where he met "The Mother". Thompson has called Sri Aurobindo's teaching on spirituality a "radical anarchism" and a "post-religious approach" and regards their work as having "... reached back into the Goddess culture of prehistory, and, in Marshall McLuhan's terms, 'culturally retrieved' the archetypes of the shaman and la sage femme... " Thompson also writes that he experienced Shakti, or psychic power coming from The Mother on the night of her death in 1973.

Sri Aurobindo's ideas about the further evolution of human capabilities influenced the thinking of Michael Murphy – and indirectly, the human potential movement, through Murphy's writings.

The American philosopher Ken Wilber has called Sri Aurobindo "India's greatest modern philosopher sage" and has integrated some of his ideas into his philosophical vision. Wilber's interpretation of Aurobindo has been criticised by Rod Hemsell. New Age writer Andrew Harvey also looks to Sri Aurobindo as a major inspiration.

Followers 
The following authors, disciples and organisations trace their intellectual heritage back to, or have in some measure been influenced by, Sri Aurobindo and The Mother.
 Nolini Kanta Gupta (1889–1983) was one of Sri Aurobindo's senior disciples, and wrote extensively on philosophy, mysticism, and spiritual evolution based on the teaching of Sri Aurobindo and "The Mother".
 Nirodbaran (1903–2006). A doctor who obtained his medical degree from Edinburgh, his long and voluminous correspondence with Sri Aurobindo elaborate on many aspects of Integral Yoga and fastidious record of conversations bring out Sri Aurobindo's thought on numerous subjects.
 M. P. Pandit (1918–1993). Secretary to "The Mother" and the ashram, his copious writings and lectures cover Yoga, the Vedas, Tantra, Sri Aubindo's epic "Savitri" and others.
 Sri Chinmoy (1931–2007) joined the ashram in 1944. Later, he wrote the play about Sri Aurobindo's life – Sri Aurobindo: Descent of the Blue – and a book, Infinite: Sri Aurobindo. An author, composer, artist and athlete, he was perhaps best known for holding public events on the theme of inner peace and world harmony (such as concerts, meditations, and races).
 Pavitra (1894–1969) was one of their early disciples. Born as Philippe Barbier Saint-Hilaire in Paris. Pavitra left some very interesting memoirs of his conversations with them in 1925 and 1926, which were published as Conversations avec Pavitra.
 Dilipkumar Roy (1897–1980) was an Indian Bengali musician, musicologist, novelist, poet and essayist.
 T.V. Kapali Sastry (1886–1953) was an eminent author and Sanskrit scholar. He joined the Sri Aurobindo Ashram in 1929 and wrote books and articles in four languages, exploring especially Sri Aurobindo's Vedic interpretations.
 Satprem (1923–2007) was a French author and an important disciple of "The Mother" who published Mother's Agenda (1982), Sri Aurobindo or the Adventure of Consciousness (2000), On the Way to Supermanhood (2002) and more.
 Indra Sen (1903–1994) was another disciple of Sri Aurobindo who, although little-known in the West, was the first to articulate integral psychology and integral philosophy, in the 1940s and 1950s. A compilation of his papers came out under the title, Integral Psychology in 1986.
K. D. Sethna (1904–2011) was an Indian poet, scholar, writer, cultural critic and disciple of Sri Aurobindo. For several decades he was the editor of the Ashram journal Mother India.
 Margaret Woodrow Wilson (Nistha) (1886–1944), daughter of US President Woodrow Wilson, she came to the ashram in 1938 and stayed there until her death. She helped to prepare a revised edition of The Life Divine.

Critics 
 Adi Da finds that Sri Aurobindo's contributions were merely literary and cultural and had extended his political motivation into spirituality and human evolution
 N. R. Malkani finds Sri Aurobindo's theory of creation to be false, as the theory talks about experiences and visions which are beyond normal human experiences. He says the theory is an intellectual response to a difficult problem and that Sri Aurobindo uses the trait of unpredictability in theorising and discussing things not based upon the truth of existence. Malkani says that awareness is already a reality and suggests there would be no need to examine the creative activity subjected to awareness.
 Ken Wilber's interpretation of Sri Aurobindo's philosophy differed from the notion of dividing reality as a different level of matter, life, mind, overmind, supermind proposed by Sri Aurobindo in The Life Divine, and terms them as higher- or lower-nested holons and states that there is only a fourfold reality (a system of reality created by himself).
 Rajneesh (Osho), in response to his devotees that "Sri Aurobindo says there is something more than the enlightenment of Gautam Buddha", stated that Sri Aurobindo "knows everything about enlightenment, but he is not enlightened.

In popular culture 
The 1970 Indian Bengali-language biographical drama film Mahabiplabi Aurobindo, directed by Dipak Gupta, depicted Sri Aurobindo's life on screen. On the 72nd Republic Day of India, the Ministry of Culture presented a tableau on his life.

Literature

Indian editions 

 A first edition of collected works was published in 1972 in 30 volumes: Sri Aurobindo Birth Centenary Library (SABCL), Pondicherry: Sri Aurobindo Ashram.
 A new edition of collected works was started in 1995. Currently, 36 out of 37 volumes have been published: Complete Works of Sri Aurobindo (CWSA). Pondicherry: Sri Aurobindo Ashram.
 Early Cultural Writings. 
 Collected Poems. 
 Collected Plays and Stories. 
 Karmayogin.
 Records of Yoga. 
 Vedic and Philological Studies. 
 The Secrets of the Veda. 
 Hymns to the Mystic Fire.
 Isha Upanishad. 
 Kena and Other Upanishads. 
 Essays on the Gita. 
 The Renaissance of India with a Defence of Indian Culture. 
 The Life Divine. 
 The Synthesis of Yoga. 
 The Human Cycle – The Ideal of Human Unity – War and Self-Determination. 
 The Future Poetry. 
 Letters on Poetry and Art
 Letters on Yoga. 
 The Mother 
 Savitri – A Legend and a Symbol. 
 Letters on Himself and the Ashram. 
 Autobiographical Notes and Other Writings of Historical Interest.

American edition

Main Works 
 Sri Aurobindo Primary Works Set 12 vol. US Edition, Lotus Press, Twin Lakes, Wisconsin 
 Sri Aurobindo Selected Writings Software CD-ROM, Lotus Press, Twin Lakes, Wisconsin 
 The Life Divine, Lotus Press, Twin Lakes, Wisconsin 
 Savitri: A Legend and a Symbol, Lotus Press, Twin Lakes, Wisconsin 
 The Synthesis of Yoga, Lotus Press, Twin Lakes, Wisconsin 
 Essays on the Gita, Lotus Press, Twin Lakes, Wisconsin 
 The Ideal of Human Unity, Lotus Press, Twin Lakes, Wisconsin 
 The Human Cycle: The Psychology of Social Development, Lotus Press, Twin Lakes, Wisconsin 
 The Human Cycle, Ideal of Human Unity, War and Self Determination, Lotus Press. 
 The Upanishads, Lotus Press, Twin Lakes, Wisconsin 
 Secret of the Veda, Lotus Press, Twin Lakes, Wisconsin 
 Hymns to the Mystic Fire, Lotus Press, Twin Lakes, Wisconsin 
 The Mother, Lotus Press, Twin Lakes, Wisconsin

Compilations and Secondary Literature 

 The Integral Yoga: Sri Aurobindo's Teaching and Method of Practice, Lotus Press, Twin Lakes, Wisconsin 
 The Future Evolution of Man, Lotus Press, Twin Lakes, Wisconsin 
 The Essential Aurobindo – Writings of Sri Aurobindo 
 Bhagavad Gita and Its Message, Lotus Press, Twin Lakes, Wisconsin 
 The Mind of Light, Lotus Press, Twin Lakes, Wisconsin 
 Rebirth and Karma, Lotus Press, Twin Lakes, Wisconsin 
 Hour of God by Sri Aurobindo, Lotus Press. 
 Dictionary of Sri Aurobindo's Yoga, (compiled by M.P. Pandit), Lotus Press, Twin Lakes, Wisconsin 
 Vedic Symbolism, Lotus Press, Twin Lakes, Wisconsin 
 The Powers Within, Lotus Press. 
 Reading Sri Aurobindo, Penguin Random House India.

Comparative studies 
 Hemsell, Rod (Oct. 2014). The Philosophy of Evolution. Auro-e-Books, E-Book
 Hemsell, Rod (Dec. 2014). Sri Aurobindo and the Logic of the Infinite: Essays for the New Millennium. Auro-e-Books, E-Book
 Hemsell, Rod (2017). The Philosophy of Consciousness: Hegel and Sri Aurobindo. E-Book
 Huchzermeyer, Wilfried (Oct. 2018). Sri Aurobindo’s Commentaries on Krishna, Buddha, Christ and Ramakrishna. Their Role in the Evolution of Humanity. edition sawitri, E-Book
 Johnston, David T. (Nov. 2016) Jung's Global Vision: Western Psyche, Eastern Mind, With References to Sri Aurobindo, Integral Yoga, The Mother. Agio Publishing House, 
 Johnston, David T. (Dec. 2016). Prophets in Our Midst: Jung, Tolkien, Gebser, Sri Aurobindo and the Mother. Universe, E-Book
 Singh, Satya Prakash (2013). Nature of God. A Comparative Study in Sri Aurobindo and Whitehead. Antrik Express Digital, E-Book
 Singh, Satya Prakash (2005). Sri Aurobindo, Jung and Vedic Yoga. Mira Aditi Centre, 
 Eric M. Weiss (2003): The Doctrine of the Subtle Worlds. Sri Aurobindo’s Cosmology, Modern Science and the Metaphysics of Alfred North Whitehead, Dissertation (PDF; 1,3 MB), California Institute of Integral Studies, San Francisco

See also 
 Integral psychology

References 
Notes

Citations

Bibliography

Further reading 

  (2 volumes, 1945) – written in a hagiographical style
 
 
 
 
 
 
 K. D. Sethna, Vision and Work of Sri Aurobindo
 
 
 Raychaudhuri, Girijashankar.....Sri Aurobindo O Banglar Swadeshi Joog (published 1956)...this book was serially published in the journal Udbodhan and read out to Sri Aurobindo in Pondicherry while he was still alive......Sri Aurobindo commented, " he will snatch away smile from my face"
Ghose, Aurobindo, Nahar, S., & Institut de recherches évolutives. (2000). India's rebirth: A selection from Sri Aurobindo's writing, talks and speeches Paris: Institut de recherches évolutives.

External links 

  Sri Aurobindo Ashram
 
 
 Auroville
 Complete Works of Sri Aurobindo

 
1872 births
1950 deaths
Bengali Hindus
20th-century Hindu religious leaders
Advaitin philosophers
Anushilan Samiti
Alumni of King's College, Cambridge
Alumni of the University of Cambridge
Bengali Hindu saints
19th-century Bengalis
20th-century Bengalis
Bengali spiritual writers
Spiritual evolution
English-language poets from India
English spiritual writers
Hindu revivalists
20th-century Hindu philosophers and theologians
Hindu reformers
Indian Hindu yogis
Integral thought
Indian male essayists
Indian spiritual writers
Indian male poets
19th-century Indian translators
Indian revolutionaries
Indian civil servants
Swadeshi activists
People from Kolkata
People from Vadodara
Academic staff of Maharaja Sayajirao University of Baroda
People educated at St Paul's School, London
Prisoners and detainees of British India
19th-century Indian philosophers
20th-century Indian philosophers
19th-century Indian poets
20th-century Indian poets
19th-century Indian non-fiction writers
20th-century Indian non-fiction writers
Indian male writers
Bengali writers
Writers from Puducherry
Poets from West Bengal
20th-century Indian essayists
Indian political philosophers
19th-century Indian educational theorists
20th-century Indian educational theorists
Neo-Vedanta
20th-century Indian translators
Scholars from Puducherry
Revolutionaries of Bengal during British Rule
Modern yoga gurus
Scholars from West Bengal